Edmund G. Love (February 14, 1912 – August 30, 1990) was an American author. He was the author of 20 books including Hanging On, A Small Bequest, and Subways Are for Sleeping, which was the basis for the Broadway musical of the same name.

Early life and education
Love grew up in Flushing, Michigan and spent much of his childhood watching and interacting with the train system and engineers that worked on trains in the town. Later, Love wrote about the difficulties of living up to the legend of his family. His father had played Major League Baseball, one grandfather had competed as a heavyweight boxer and fought in a match against John L. Sullivan, and another grandfather was a professional billiards player who came close to beating Willie Hoppe in an official match. Love received a Bachelor of Arts and a Master of Fine Arts degree from the University of Michigan. During his attendance, he competed for literary prizes with rival schoolmates such as Arthur Miller and Betty Smith.

During the difficult times of the Great Depression, Love was laid off from his job at an automobile plant in 1934. He inherited some lakefront property from his relatives that year and spent the summer there with his friend George. Overall, the experience was not a positive one, and Love used those events in his later book, A Small Bequest.

Career
During World War II, he served in the Army and later on headed the team that recorded military histories of the war in the Pacific. This led to his love for writing, especially in freelance publications.

Subways Are for Sleeping
The background of Love's 1958 book Subways Are for Sleeping involved him going through the experience of having to sleep on subway trains in New York City during the time period where he had been homeless. The focus of the book was the people that he met in similar situations, ranging from street musicians to backpacking tourists, that he referred to as the "Twilight People". The book's title came about from a quote by Henry Shelby, a person who lived on the subway and explored Manhattan during the daytime. The novel would later be adopted into a Broadway musical of the same name after the rights for the production were bought from Love by Jule Styne in February 1958.

Goal to eat from every restaurant in New York City Yellow Pages
During the time period where he was homeless in 1952 and afterwards when his book became successful, Love began going alphabetically through the Manhattan version of the yellow pages and every restaurant listed inside. At the beginning, he had been working in the cheese department of a supermarket located in Morristown, New Jersey and earning around $40 per week, which he preferably spent on his job-hunting day at a restaurant named Shines. Eventually, he decided he wanted more variety and was recommended by a police officer to look in the yellow pages for options. While he started his alphabetical tour almost as a joke, Love stated that he also kept going in order to spite the expensive taste of his ex-wife. By the early 1970's, he had completed the over 6,000 locations listed in the directory and began going through the new restaurants that had opened since he began.

Hanging On
A far later publication of his, Love's 1988 book Hanging On is another historical life anecdote covering his early life with his family and how they survived the Great Depression together while living in Flint. The book itself became a piece of scholarly coverage of American history and would be used in academic classes at the University of Michigan when discussing that period of time.

Other works
Some of Love's other works would be used for film and television productions, including the film Destination Gobi and the story that the Naked City episode "Goodbye My Lady Love" is based on.

A collection of Love's work, including his diaries, photographs, and correspondences, are housed at the Bentley Historical Library.

Personal life
Love had a daughter, Shannon Gay Love, with his first wife. They divorced in 1949. He remarried to Anna V. Worts on September 21, 1956. Together they had a son, Nicholas Gregory Love, and four grandchildren. Love died at St. Joseph's Hospital in Flint, Michigan on August 30, 1990 after attempting recovery from a heart attack at home.

Bibliography
The 27th Infantry Division in World War II Infantry Journal Press, 1949
The Hourglass, A History Of The 7th Infantry Division In World War II Infantry Journal Press, 1950
Seizure of the Gilberts and Marshalls, with Philip Crowl, 1955
Subways Are for Sleeping Signet, 1958
War is a Private Affair Harcourt Brace & Co, 1959
Arsenic and Red Tape Signet, 1960
The Beautiful and Anxious Maidens, 1962
An end to bugling Harper & Row, 1963
The Situation in Flushing Wayne State University Press, 1965
A shipment of Tarts Doubleday, 1967
Set-up Doubleday, 1980
Hanging on Or, How to Get Through a Depression and Enjoy Life Wayne State University Press, 1987
A Small Bequest Wayne State University Press, 1987

References

External links
 Official IMDB Entry
Find a Grave entry

1912 births
1990 deaths
American writers
Flushing, Michigan
Military personnel from Michigan
People from Genesee County, Michigan
20th-century American male writers
University of Michigan alumni
Writers from Michigan
United States Army personnel of World War II